Roger la Honte may refer to:

 Roger la Honte (novel), novel by Jules Mary

Films based on the novel:
 Roger la Honte (1913 film), French silent film directed by Adrien Caillard
 Roger la Honte (1922 film), French silent film directed by Jacques de Baroncelli 
 Roger la Honte (1933 film), French film directed by Gaston Roudès 
 Roger la Honte (1946 film), French film adaptation directed by André Cayatte
 Trap for the Assassin, 1966 French-Italian film known in French as Roger la Honte

See also
 The Revenge of Roger